Christian Jensen may refer to:

 Christian Albrecht Jensen (1792–1870), Danish portrait painter
 Christian Jensen (politician) (1823–1884), Norwegian politician
 Christian E.O. Jensen (1859–1941), Danish pharmacist and botanist
 Christian Cornelius Jensen (1883–1940), German classical philologist
 Christian Ludvig Jensen (1885–1978), Norwegian barrister, politician and organizational leader
 Christian Jensen (weightlifter) (1888-1947), Danish Olympic weightlifter